The Ward-Hays House is a historic house at 1008 West 2nd Street in Little Rock, Arkansas.  It is a two-story brick building, distinguished by a massive front portico, with two-story fluted Ionic columns supporting an elaborate entablature and cornice.  The house was built in 1886 for the son of Zeb Ward by prison labor provided by the Arkansas State Penitentiary, which Ward headed at the time.  Its second owner was John Quitman Hays, a prominent railroad engineer.

The house was listed on the National Register of Historic Places in 1975.

See also
National Register of Historic Places listings in Little Rock, Arkansas

References

Houses on the National Register of Historic Places in Arkansas
Houses completed in 1886
Houses in Little Rock, Arkansas